Vermeer Corporation is a manufacturer of industrial and agricultural equipment. The privately held company distributes products globally from seven production facilities and offices in Pella, Iowa, United States and multiple locations worldwide. Founded in 1948 by Gary Vermeer, as Vermeer Manufacturing Company, the company is in its third generation of family management under President and CEO Jason Andringa as well as other members of the third generation. Vermeer serves the construction, landscaping, environmental, excavation, and forage markets domestically and internationally from locations in the Netherlands, Germany, Mainland China, Singapore, Hong Kong(China), Canada, and Brazil, as well as various wholly and partially owned subsidiaries in the United States. Its products are sold and supported by independent dealers in over 60 countries.

History 

In central Iowa in 1943, Gary Vermeer created a mechanical hoist to ease the process of unloading his grain wagon during harvest. Farm neighbors observed his wagon hoist in operation and asked for ones of their own. At his request, a local machine shop fabricated a number of these hoists to meet the demand. Today, Vermeer holds several product and design patents within its line of utility and track trenchers, directional boring systems, tub grinders, tree equipment, excavation machines, and hay-harvesting products. The company markets 100 agricultural and industrial products worldwide, and operates  of plant space for manufacturing. On July 19, 2018 the Vermeer campus was hit by a tornado causing significant damage to two plant buildings and minor damage to other buildings

Milestones
Portable Pow-R Drive, a self-propelled irrigation system, hay conditioner and cutter are introduced in the 1950s.
Vermeer invents the first machine to dig, transport and replace large trees in the 1960s.
The first larger round hay baler was invented by Gary Vermeer in 1971.  Allis Chalmers first introduced the small round rotobaler in 1947.
Vermeer begins building large trenchers to lay underground pipelines in the 1980s.
The first Vermeer horizontal directional drill is introduced in the 1990s.
The prototype of the first self-propelled hay baler is demonstrated in 2017.

References

External links 

 Vermeer website

Agriculture companies of the United States
Companies based in Iowa
Manufacturing companies established in 1948
Marion County, Iowa
Pella, Iowa
1948 establishments in Iowa